Granić is a surname. It may refer to:

Goran Granić (born 1950), Croatian centre-left politician who was the deputy prime minister from 2000 to 2002
Goran Granić (footballer), Bosnia and Herzegovina football player
Mate Granić (born 1947), Croatian diplomat and politician

See also
Keine Grenzen-Żadnych granic, the Polish entry in the Eurovision Song Contest 2003

Croatian surnames